is a Japanese professional shogi player ranked 7-dan.

Early life
Muranaka was born on March 12, 1981, in Kita, Tokyo. He entered the Japan Shogi Association's apprentice school at the rank of 6-kyū as a student of shogi professional  in 1992. He was the last apprentice taken on by Takayanagi.

Muranaka was promoted to the rank of 1-dan in 1996 and obtained full professional status and the rank of 4-dan in October 2004 after finishing tied for first in the 35th 3-dan League (April 2004September 2004) with a record of 14 wins and 4 losses.

Promotion history
The promotion history for Muranaka is as follows:
 6-kyū: 1992
 1-dan: 1996
 4-dan: October 1, 2004
 5-dan: September 15, 2009
 6-dan: October 16, 2009
 7-dan: October 4, 2019

Personal life
On December 13, 2022, the  announced on its official website that Muranaka had married tarento  on November 22, 2022.

References

External links 

 ShogiHub: Professional Player Info · Muranaka, Shuji
 blog: マイペースなブログ 
 YouTube: 【Professional Shogi (Japanese Chess) Player】Mura Channel · videos have English captioning

Japanese shogi players
Living people
Professional shogi players
Professional shogi players from Tokyo
1981 births
People from Kita
Shogi YouTubers
Japanese YouTubers